George H Clark was a New Zealand cricketer. He played eight first-class matches for Otago between 1872 and 1880 and later stood as an umpire in first-class matches.

References

External links
 

Year of birth missing
Year of death missing
New Zealand cricketers
Otago cricketers
Place of birth missing